Minuscule 538 (in the Gregory-Aland numbering), ε 335 (von Soden), is a Greek minuscule manuscript of the New Testament on a parchment. Dated palaeographically to the 12th or 13th century. Formerly it was labelled as Wd and 552 (Scrivener).
The manuscript is lacunose.
It was adapted for liturgical use.

Description 

The codex contains the text of the four Gospels, on 212 parchment leaves (15.2 cm by 11 cm) with some lacunae (Matthew 1:1-12:41; 15:14-30; Mark 14:9-20; John 1:1-15). It is written in one column per page, 24 lines per page in minuscule letters. The letters are neatly written.

There is also a division according to the Ammonian Sections (in Mark 241 Sections - the last in 16:20), with references to the Eusebian Canons (written at the margin below Ammonian Section numbers).

The manuscript was bound and numbered later.

Some leaves were cut in a trapezoidal shape. Gospel order is mixed with various leaves misplaced in other areas of the manuscript (folio 153 recto has John 1:15).

Text 

The Greek text of the codex is a representative of the Byzantine text-type. Hermann von Soden classified it as a member of the textual family Kx. In Mark and Luke it closer to K1. Aland placed it in Category V.
The manuscript has some non-Byzantine elements. It has some textual affinities to the early versions of the Gospels.
According to the Claremont Profile Method it represents the textual family Kx in Luke 1 and Luke 20. In Luke 10 it has mixed Byzantine text.

History 

The manuscript was brought from Janina (Epirus) between 1870 and 1872 together with the codices 532-546 and bought by Baroness Burdett-Coutts (1814-1906), a philanthropist. It was presented by Burdett-Coutts to Sir Roger Cholmely's School, and was housed at the Highgate (Burdett-Coutts II. 18), in London.

It was added to the list of the New Testament manuscripts by F. H. A. Scrivener (552) and C. R. Gregory (538). Gregory saw it in 1883.

The manuscript was examined and collated by Scrivener in his Adversaria critica sacra.

Currently the codex is housed at the University of Michigan (Ms. 18), in Ann Arbor.

See also 

 List of New Testament minuscules
 Textual criticism
 Biblical manuscript

References

Further reading 

 F. H. A. Scrivener, Adversaria critica sacra (Cambridge and London, 1893), pp. XLV-XLVI. (as l)
 K. W. Clark, A Descriptive Catalogue of Greek New Testament Manuscripts in America (Chicago, 1937), pp. 285–286. 
 William Merritt Read, A Collation of the University of Michigan Manuscript no. 18 of the Four Gospels Seattle, University of Washington Press, 1942.

External links 
 Images of Minuscule 538 at the CSNTM
 William Merritt Read, Michigan Manuscript 18 of The Gospels. Seattle, Univ. of Washington Press, 1942.

Greek New Testament minuscules
12th-century biblical manuscripts
University of Michigan